Bokaro Ispat Vidyalayas are a set of schools in the town of Bokaro Steel City, Jharkhand, India run by Education Department of Bokaro Steel Limited. In every sector (total 12 sector in Bokaro) minimal one middle and one high school were established. Earlier these school were affiliated to Bihar Vidalaya pariksha samati and Bihar intermediate education council. Later all of them are affiliated to Central Board of Secondary Education. They offers education from classes 1 to Class XII. Bokaro Ispat Vidyalaya encourages the students to take part in various co-curricular activities held in school such as music, dance, arts and sports. The campus of Bokaro Ispat Vidyalaya is equipped with  infrastructural facilities such as class rooms with teaching aids, library, computer labs, science labs and play ground. Since these school were funded by SAIL so very minimal fee were applicable to these school.

Since establishment total number of alumni of these school were at least 300 thousands.

See also
Bokaro ispat vidyalaya IX/D

References

Educational institutions established in 1991
Schools in Jharkhand
1991 establishments in Bihar